Gamble Mill, also known as Lamb Mill, Thomas Mill, Wagner Mill, and Bellefonte Flouring Mill, is an historic grist mill located at Bellefonte, Centre County, Pennsylvania.

Located in the Bellefonte Historic District, it was added to the National Register of Historic Places in 1975.

History and architectural features
Built in 1894, Gamble Mill is a three-and-one-half-story brick building that was erected on a limestone foundation. There have been two, one-story brick additions.

This historic structure features a stepped gable, with a full gabled attic. It replaced a mill that had been built on this site in 1786, but was destroyed by fire in 1892. The mill ceased being used for grinding grain in 1947.

It was added to the National Register of Historic Places in 1975.  It is located in the Bellefonte Historic District.

References

External links
Gamble Mill: Virtual Walking Tour of Bellefonte, Pennsylvania, Bellefonte Historical and Cultural Association website

Grinding mills on the National Register of Historic Places in Pennsylvania
Industrial buildings completed in 1894
Buildings and structures in Centre County, Pennsylvania
Grinding mills in Pennsylvania
National Register of Historic Places in Centre County, Pennsylvania
Individually listed contributing properties to historic districts on the National Register in Pennsylvania